The Zimbabwe national cricket team toured the West Indies for a five-match One Day International (ODI) series and one Twenty20 International between 26 February and 14 March 2010.

Tour matches

50-over tour match: UWI Vice Chancellor's XI  v Zimbabweans

Twenty20 International series

Only T20I

One Day International series

1st ODI

2nd ODI

3rd ODI

4th ODI

5th ODI

Media coverage

Sky Sports (live) – United Kingdom
SuperSport (live) – South Africa
Ten Sports (live) – Middle East
Zee Sports (live) – India

References

2009–10 West Indian cricket season
West Indies
International cricket competitions in 2009–10
2009-10